Mordellistena consililis is a beetle in the genus Mordellistena of the family Mordellidae. It was described in 1922 by Blair.

References

consililis
Beetles described in 1922